Fritz Krempel (23 November 1905 – 1984) was a German sports shooter. He competed in the 50 m pistol event at the 1952 Summer Olympics.

References

1905 births
1984 deaths
German male sport shooters
Olympic shooters of Germany
Shooters at the 1952 Summer Olympics
Place of birth missing